Debi is a 2005 devotional Bengali film directed by Swapan Saha and produced by Mukul Sarkar. It is a remake of Kodi Ramakrishna's Ammoru (1995). The film features Jisshu Sengupta, Debashree Roy and Rachana Banerjee in the lead roles. Music of the film has been composed by Ashok Bhadra.

Cast 
 Jisshu Sengupta
 Debashree Roy
 Rachana Banerjee as Joba
 Ramaprasad Banik
 Locket Chatterjee
 Koushik Bandyopadhyay as Ashur
 Sunil Mukhopadhyay
 Sanghamitra Bandyopadhyay
 Ashok Mukhopadhyay
 Ramen Raychowdhury

Soundtrack 
The songs were composed by Ashok Bhadra.

References 

2000s Bengali-language films
2005 films
Bengali-language Indian films
Films directed by Swapan Saha
Bengali remakes of Telugu films
Indian drama films